Individuals and events related to Turkey in 2022.

Incumbents 
 President: Recep Tayyip Erdoğan
 29th Speaker of the Grand National Assembly: Mustafa Şentop
 President of the Constitutional Court: Zühtü Arslan
 Chief of the Turkish General Staff of the Armed Forces: Yaşar Güler
 Government: 66th government of Turkey
 Cabinet: Fourth Erdoğan Cabinet

Events

Ongoing 
 COVID-19 pandemic in Turkey
 2016–present purges in Turkey
 2018–2022 Turkish currency and debt crisis

January 
 January: Turkey's authorities decided to rebrand their country's international image. President Recep Tayyip Erdoğan issued a communiqué, tweaking the country's internationally recognised name from "Turkey" to "Türkiye".
 January 1: Turkey lifts its embargo on Armenia.
 January 8: Konya - Karaman high-speed train line was put into service.
 January 13: Turkey's first pocket satellite was launched into space.
 January 23: Storm Elpis

February
 February 2: After the start of the normalization process between Armenia and Turkey, flights between the two countries started.
 February 5: Recep Tayyip Erdoğan, and his wife, Emine Erdoğan, contract COVID-19 and have mild symptoms.
 February 16: The Council of Higher Education announced that the threshold score in the Higher Education Institutions Exam was removed.

March
 March 2: Due to the COVID-19 pandemic in Turkey, the HES Code application, which had been implemented since April 10, 2020, and the obligation to wear masks in open areas were lifted as a result of the Coronavirus Scientific Advisory Board meeting held on March 2, 2022. However, the Advisory Board announced that the HES Code application would continue in public transport and the use of masks in closed areas will continue.
 March 9: Israeli President Isaac Herzog meets Erdoğan in Ankara, in what is perceived to be a renewal of relations between Israel and Turkey, which have been poor since 2010.
 March 10: Russian Foreign Minister Sergey Lavrov and Ukrainian Foreign Minister Dmytro Kuleba discussed the Russian-Ukrainian War in Antalya. Negotiations on ending the Russian invasion of Ukraine, the evacuation of civilians and a ceasefire were not fruitful.
 March 18: The Kınalı-Balıkesir Motorway, which the 1915 Çanakkale Bridge is a part of, was put into service.
 March 29: Russian and Ukrainian delegations met in Dolmabahçe, Istanbul as part of the Russia-Ukraine Peace Talks. Even though the meeting ended without positive results, the Ukrainian authorities stated that they would like to see Turkey among the guarantor countries.

April
 April 7: The case file on the murder of journalist Jamal Khashoggi at the Consulate General of Saudi Arabia in Istanbul on October 2, 2018 was transferred to Saudi Arabia.
 April 17: Operation Claw-Lock
 April 26: As a result of the decision taken by the Coronavirus Scientific Advisory Board, the obligation to use masks in closed areas was removed. However, it was announced that the obligation to wear masks in public transportation vehicles and hospitals would continue.
 April 27: In the FIBA Europe Cup final, Bahçeşehir Koleji S.K. defeated Pallacanestro Reggiana and became the 2021–22 FIBA Europe Cup champion. In addition, Bahçeşehir Koleji became the first Turkish team to win the cup.

May
 May 21: Anadolu Efes S.K. became the EuroLeague champion for the second time in a row by beating their opponent Real Madrid Baloncesto in the 2021–22 EuroLeague final match.
 May 22: In the 2021–22 CEV Women's Champions League final, VakıfBank S.K. became the European champion for the fifth time by beating its rival Imoco Volley.
 May 25: For the first time in 15 years, Israel and Turkey held a meeting at the level of the Minister of Foreign Affairs. Foreign Minister Mevlüt Çavuşoğlu met with his Israeli counterpart, Yair Lapid, in Tel Aviv, where regional issues and relations between the two countries were discussed.

June
 June 2: The United Nations agrees to officially change the English name of the country from Turkey to Türkiye.
 June 14: Türksat 5B was put into service.
 June 21: A forest fire started around Marmaris's Bördübet village.
 June 22: An Iranian spy gang, which was preparing to attack Israeli tourists in Istanbul, was caught as a result of the operation organized by the MİT and the Istanbul Police Department.
 June 23: As part of the normalization process of Israel–Turkey relations, Foreign Minister Mevlüt Çavuşoğlu met with his Israeli counterpart, Yair Lapid, in Ankara.
 June 24: The suspect, who was stated to have started the Marmaris forest fires, was arrested.
 June 25:
 The operations in the Çöpler mine in the İliç district of Erzincan were stopped by the Ministry of Environment, Urbanisation and Climate Change due to environmental pollution caused by cyanide leakage.
 Marmaris forest fires were brought under control on the 4th day.
 June 30: The first monkeypox case in Turkey was announced by Health Minister Fahrettin Koca.

July 
 July 6:
 Turkey finished the 2022 Mediterranean Games in second place after Italy with 108 medals.
 After the death of specialist doctor Ekrem Karakaya at Konya City Hospital while on duty, the healthcare professionals decided to leave work on 7 and 8 July as a sign of protest.
 July 7: Israeli Transport Minister Merav Michaeli announced that an aviation agreement would be signed between Israel and Turkey after 71 years.
 July 9: Credit rating agency Fitch Ratings downgraded Turkey's credit rating from "B+" to "B", citing rising inflation, widening current account deficit and other economic risks.
 July 11: President Recep Tayyip Erdoğan met with Prime Minister of Armenia Nikol Pashinyan. During their meeting, the two leaders emphasized the importance of the normalization process between Armenia and Turkey.
 July 13:
 A forest fire started in Datça, Muğla. The fire was brought under control after 24 hours. The Ministry of Agriculture and Forestry reported that 700 hectares of agricultural and forest areas were damaged and 7 people were injured.
 A forest fire started at two different points in Çeşme, İzmir. The fire was brought under control after 24 hours. A total of 120 hectares of land was damaged in the two fires. Seven people were detained in connection with the cause of the fire.
 Turkish, Ukrainian, Russian and UN delegations held a summit in Istanbul to discuss a solution to the Grain Crisis caused by the Russian invasion of Ukraine and the creation of a grain corridor by opening Ukrainian ports.
 July 21: An earthquake with a magnitude of 4.6 occurred in Gönen, Balıkesir. The earthquake was felt in the surrounding cities.
 July 22: The solution tp the Grain Crisis caused by the Russian invasion of Ukraine and the agreement to open a grain corridor by opening the Ukrainian ports of Chornomorsk, Odesa and Yuzhne was signed by President of Turkey Recep Tayyip Erdoğan, United Nations Secretary General António Guterres, Russian Defense Minister Sergey Shoygu and Turkish Defense Minister Hulusi Akar in Dolmabahçe, Istanbul.
 July 29: 5G started to be used for the first time in Turkey at Istanbul Airport.
 July 30:
 2022 Turkish Super Cup.
 National swimmer Aysu Türkoğlu became the youngest Turkish swimmer to cross the English Channel in 16 hours and 28 minutes.

August 
 August 4:
 A fire broke out in the historical Balıklı Greek Hospital in Zeytinburnu, Istanbul. 104 patients in the hospital were evacuated and no one was killed or injured in the fire. The hospital became unusable as a result of the fire. Bakırköy Chief Public Prosecutor's Office launched an investigation on the issue.
 The results of the Public Personnel Selection Exam held on 31 July became void due to a scandal that saw the questions leaked beforehand. Halis Aygün was dismissed as the President of Measuring, Selection and Placement Center and Bayram Ali Ersoy was appointed instead. The center announced that it had postponed in its sessions due to be held on August 6–7 and August 14.
 August 18: Israel and Turkey announce the resumption of full diplomatic relations.
 August 20: 2022 Turkey bus crashes.
 August 26: The Ministry of Environment, Urbanization and Climate Change announced that the ship named "NAE Sao Paulo", which was brought to Turkey for dismantling from Brazil, would not be allowed to enter Turkish territorial waters on the grounds that it contains asbestos.

September 
 September 1: An armed attack took place on the headquarters of the TFF in Riva, Istanbul, while the board of directors held a meeting. While no one was killed or injured as a result of the attack, two suspects who carried out the attack were caught.
 September 18: Thousands march in Istanbul in an anti-LGBTQ march.
 September 26: PKK militants opened fire on a police house in the Tece neighborhood of Mersin's Mezitli district, and a bomb attack was carried out.

October 
 October 6: Within the scope of the normalization process between Armenia and Turkey, President Recep Tayyip Erdoğan and Prime Minister of Armenia Nikol Pashinyan met for the first time at the European Political Community summit held in Prague.
 October 14: an explosion in a mine in Amasra, Bartın Province, killed 42 people.
 October 29: Turkey's domestic car Togg started mass production.

November 
 November 5: Gaziray suburban line was put into service.
 November 12: At 18:57, a simultaneous earthquake drill was held for the first time in Turkey.
 November 13: 2022 Istanbul bombing
 November 20: Operation Claw-Sword
 November 21: An earthquake with a magnitude of 5.4 occurred off the Datça district of Muğla.
 November 22: Turkey's highest dam Yusufeli Dam came into service.
 November 23: 2022 Düzce earthquake
 November 26: Turkey's highest pedestal viaduct, Eğiste Hadimi Viaduct, was put into service.

December 
 December 14: Unmanned fighter aircraft Baykar Bayraktar Kızılelma made its first flight.
 December 26: President Recep Tayyip Erdoğan announced that there were 170 billion cubic meters of natural gas reserves in the Black Sea. Thus, the total natural gas reserves in the Black Sea reached 710 billion cubic meters.

Deaths

January
 January 11: Ahmet Çalık, footballer (born 1994)
 January 24
 Fatma Girik, actress and politician (born 1942)
 Ayberk Pekcan, actor (born 1970)

February 
 February 3 : Olcay Neyzi, doctor (b. 1927)
 February 6 : Üner Tan, neuroscientist and evolutionary biologist (b. 1937)
 February 15
 Onur Kumbaracıbaşı, civil servant and politician (b. 1939)
 Arif Şentürk, traditional folk singer (b. 1941)
 February 22 : Muvaffak "Maffy" Falay, jazz trumpeter (b. 1930)

March 
 March 3 : Şenol Birol, footballer and manager (b. 1936)
 March 21 : Fevzi Zemzem, footballer and manager (b. 1941)
 March 23 : Özcan Köksoy, footballer (b. 1940)
 March 28 : Naci Erdem, footballer and manager (b. 1931)
 March 31 : Rıdvan Bolatlı, footballer (b. 1928)

April 
 April 21 : Aydın İlter, former general of the Turkish Gendarmerie (b. 1930)
 April 27 : İsmail Ogan, freestyle wrestler and Olympic champion (b. 1933)

May

June 
 June 8 : Tarhan Erdem, politician (born 1933)
 June 28 : Cüneyt Arkın, actor, director and producer (born 1937)

July 
 July 6 : İlter Türkmen, diplomat and politician (b. 1927)
 July 17 : Erden Kıral, film director and screenwriter (b. 1942)
 July 28 : İlhan İrem, singer and songwriter (b. 1955)

August 
 August 16 : Aydın Yelken, footballer (b. 1939)
 August 20 : Civan Canova, actor, playwright and theatre director (b. 1955)
 August 22 : Adnan Çoker, painter and academician (b. 1927)

September 
 September 11 : Ahmet Toptaş, politician (b. 1949)
 September 18 : Mustafa Dağıstanlı, freestyle wrestler and Olympic champion (b. 1931)
 September 22 : Gürkan Coşkun, painter (b. 1941)

October 
 October 15 : Billur Kalkavan, actress (b. 1962)
 October 18 : Bülend Özveren, television presenter and sports commentator (b. 1943)
 October 25 : Halit Kıvanç, journalist, writer, television and radio presenter (b. 1925)

November 
 November 20 : Hıncal Uluç, journalist and writer (b. 1939)
 November 27 : Mehmet Oğuz, footballer (b. 1949)

December

See also

 Outline of Turkey
 Index of Turkey-related articles
 List of Turkey-related topics
 History of Turkey

References

Notes

Citations

 
Turkey
Turkey
Turkey
2020s in Turkey
Years of the 21st century in Turkey